Weedon Field  is a city-owned, public-use airport located three nautical miles (4 mi, 6 km) north of the central business district of Eufaula, a city in Barbour County, Alabama, United States.

This airport is included in the FAA's National Plan of Integrated Airport Systems for 2011–2015 and 2009–2013, both of which categorized it as a general aviation facility.

Facilities and aircraft 
Weedon Field covers an area of 208 acres (84 ha) at an elevation of 285 feet (87 m) above mean sea level. It has one runway designated 18/36 with an asphalt surface measuring 5,000 by 100 feet (1,524 x 30 m).

For the 12-month period ending November 10, 2010, the airport had 36,638 aircraft operations, an average of 100 per day: 74% general aviation and 26% military. At that time there were 18 aircraft based at this airport: 61% single-engine, 6% multi-engine, 6% jet, 6% helicopter and 22% ultralight.

See also 
 List of airports in Alabama

References

External links 
 Aerial image as of February 1999 from USGS The National Map
 
 

Airports in Alabama
Transportation buildings and structures in Barbour County, Alabama